Aleksandra Rudolf (born 10 January 2002) is a Polish figure skater. She is the 2016 Polish national champion.

On the junior level, she is the 2017 Polish national silver medalist, and the 2016 Polish junior national bronze medalist.

Career
Rudolf started skating in 2007. She debuted internationally in the 2015-16 season. After a three season break, she returned to competition during the 2020-21 season.

Programs

Competitive highlights
JGP: Junior Grand Prix; CS: Challenger Series

External links

Aleksandra Rudolf at the Polish Figure Skating Association
Aleksandra Rudolf at Stats on Ice

References 

2002 births
Living people
Polish female single skaters
Sportspeople from Bydgoszcz
21st-century Polish women